The Cleveland State Vikings, or Vikes, are the athletic teams of Cleveland State University. Before as Fenn College they were known as the Fenn College Foxes or Fenn Foxes. Cleveland State competes in NCAA Division I. The Vikings have competed in NCAA Division I since 1972. They were previously members of the NCAA College Division, a precursor to NCAA Division II. The university is a member of the Horizon League (1994–present), the Mid-American Conference (2019–present) for wrestling, and the ASUN Conference (2021–present) for men's lacrosse. Cleveland State was formerly in the Mid-Continent Conference (1982–1994) and North Star Conference (1989–1992). Cleveland State previously fielded baseball, men's cross country as well as men and women's track and field. As Fenn College they fielded men's ice hockey and rifle. Cleveland State has a number of club sports as well.

Facilities

Current facilities
The Bert L. & Iris S. Wolstein Convocation Center- Men and women's basketball
Krenzler Soccer Field — Men's lacrosse, men's and women's soccer
Robert F. Busbey Natatorium – Men and women's swimming and diving
Homer E. Woodling Gymnasium – Volleyball, wrestling and fencing
Viking Field – Softball
The Robert Malaga Tennis Center – Men and women's tennis

Former facilities
All Pro Freight Stadium – Baseball
The Ellwood H. Fisher Swimming Pool – Men's swimming
Fenn Gym – Wrestling and fencing
Homer E. Woodling Gymnasium – Men and women's basketball

Athletic Director history

McCafferty Trophy
The McCafferty Trophy is awarded by the Horizon League to the school with the best overall athletic performance in all the sponsored sports. Cleveland State has won the award twice, in 2008 and 2013. Below is a table of the Cleveland State finishes and points.

Baseball

Baseball at Cleveland State was played for a total of 69 seasons. On May 2, 2011 Clevleland State University announced that they would eliminate the baseball team. The reasons cited were budget concerns as well as the difficulty of having a baseball team in the northern United States with the season starting earlier and earlier and favoring teams in the warmer southern United States.

Regular season
Mid-Continent Conference Team Championships (2):
1986, 1989
Horizon League Team Championships (0):

Tournament
Mid-Continent Conference Team Championships (0):
Horizon League Team Championships (0):

Men's basketball

Regular season
Mid-Continent Conference championships (3):
1985, 1986, 1993
Horizon League championships (2):
2011, 2021

Tournament
Mid-Continent Conference championships (1):
1986
Horizon League championships (2):
2009, 2021

Men's cross country
Cleveland State dropped Men's Cross Country after the 1993 season.
Mid-Continent Conference Team Championships (1):
1992

NCAA Championship history

Men's fencing

Record by year

Head coaching history

Football
On October 14, 2008 Cleveland State University President Michael Schwartz stated "he wants a blue ribbon panel to give him a recommendation on the football team before July 1 when he is scheduled to retire. He also said the program will have to be structured to pay for itself." On November 19, 2008 it was revealed that President Schwartz had chosen the committee members to explore the feasibility of football at Cleveland State. On October 9, 2009 it was announced the University had completed its feasibility study. From April 12–14, 2010 the Cleveland State Student Government Association polled students online about whether they favored football at Cleveland State. The results were as follows.

Men's golf

Mid-Continent Team Championships (0):
Horizon League Team Championships (10): 1998, 2006, 2008–09, 2011, 2014–18

Men's ice hockey
Ohio-Pennsylvania Intercollegiate Hockey League Team Championships (0):

Record by year

Head coaching history

Men's lacrosse
Cleveland State established its varsity men's lacrosse program on March 30, 2015. The Vikings' inaugural lacrosse match was a 13–8 home loss to Michigan on February 4, 2017.

CSU competed as an independent for its first five men's lacrosse seasons. After the 2021 season, CSU joined the newly reinstated men's lacrosse league of the ASUN Conference.

Head coaching history

Men's rifle
No team since 1937–1938, no place to shoot.

Head coaching history

Men's soccer

Regular season
Mid-Continent Conference Team Championships (3):
1984, 1986, 1988
Horizon League Team Championships (0):

Tournament
Horizon League Team Championships (1):
2012

Men's swimming & diving
Penn-Ohio Conference Championships (14): 1974, 1976-1986, 1990-1992
Mid-Continent Conference Team Championships (0):
Horizon League Team Championships (4):
1998, 1999, 2006, 2013

Record by year

Head coaching history

Men's tennis

Cleveland State dropped tennis as a sport following the 1991–1992 school year. Tennis was brought back for the 1999–2000 school year.

Mid-Continent Conference Team Championships (0):
Horizon League Team Championships (5):
2008, 2009, 2010, 2011, 2013, 2018, 2019.

Men's track & field
Cleveland State dropped Men's Track & Field after the 1992 season.

Outdoor track and field
Mid-Continent Conference Team Championships (0):

Indoor track and field
Mid-Continent Conference Team Championships (0):

NCAA Championship history

Head coaching history

Wrestling
Eastern Wrestling League Team Championships (1):
1979
Program has had at least one NCAA qualifier for the last 42 years, going back to the 1964–65 season.
Eight Vikings have achieved All-American status.
Lee Barylski, 142 pounds (1970)
Paul Azzarti, Heavyweight (1971)
Frank Yoo, 142 pounds (1972)
Tony DiGiovanni, 134 pounds (1973)
Tom Cavanaugh, 150 pounds (1973)
Toby Matney, 158 pounds (1979)
Dave Zahoransky, 142 pounds (1986, 1988)
Dan Carcelli, 142 pounds (1995)

Record by year

Head coaching history

Women's basketball

Regular season
Mid-Continent Conference Team Championships (0):
Horizon League Team Championships (0):

Tournament
Mid-Continent Conference Team Championships (0):
Horizon League Team Championships (2): 2008, 2010

Women's cross country
Mid-Continent Conference Team Championships (0):
Horizon League Team Championships (0):
First Season 1980

Women's fencing

Record by year

Women's golf
Horizon League Team Championships (1): 2017

Record by year

Totals updated through the end of the 2010–2011 school year.

Head coaching history

Women's soccer

Regular season
Horizon League Team Championships (0):

Tournament
Horizon League Team Championships (0):

Record by year

Totals updated through the end of the 2016–2017 school year.

Head coaching history

Softball

Regular season
North Star Conference Team Championships (0):
Mid-Continent Conference Team Championships (0):
Horizon League Team Championships (2):
2008, 2010

Tournament
North Star Conference Team Championships (0):
Mid-Continent Conference Team Championships (0):
Horizon League Team Championships (2):
1997, 2009

Record by year

NCAA Championship history

Head coaching history

Women's swimming & diving
Penn-Ohio Conference Championships (2): 1990 and 1991
Mid-Continent Conference Team Championships (0):
Horizon League Team Championships (0):

Record by year

Head coaching history

Women's tennis
North Star Conference Team Championships (0):
Mid-Continent Conference Team Championships (0):
Horizon League Team Championships (0):

Record by year

Head coaching history

Women's track & field
Women's Track & Field ceased to exist after the 199? season. It was reinstated beginning in 2017.

Outdoor track and field
North Star Conference Team Championships (?):
Horizon League Team Championships (0):

Indoor track and field
North Star Conference Team Championships (?):
Horizon League Team Championships (0):

Women's volleyball

Regular season
North Star Conference Team Championships (0):
Mid-Continent Conference Team Championships (0):
Horizon League Team Championships (4):
2009, 2012, 2015, 2016

Tournament
North Star Conference Team Championships (0):
Mid-Continent Conference Team Championships (0):
Horizon League Team Championships (4):
2007, 2012, 2015, 2016

Club sports – crew (rowing)
Viking Crew is  a successful coed club crew.  Each year the team travels around the nation to compete against other top collegiate crew. In 2006 the team's lightweight men's four traveled to Boston to race in the Head of the Charles Regatta.  In 2007 and 2009 the team raced at Aberdeen Dad Vail Regatta with over 37 boats in their race.  In 2009 Cleveland State won the Hammer Ergatta cup and the Cleveland Collegiate Regatta cup.

Mid-America Collegiate Rowing Association Championships (0):
Cleveland Collegiate Regatta Championships (1):
Hammer Ergatta Championships (1):

Spring season regattas

Fall season regattas

Head coaching history

Notes

References

External links

 

 
Viking Age in popular culture